The 2007 Formula Toyota season was the 18th and last season for this racing class.

Drivers and teams

All cars are Bridgestone shod Toyota FT30 cars with a Toyota 4A-GE engine.

Event calendar and results

Final standings

External links
 Schedule and results for the 2007 season

Formula Toyota
Formula Toyota